Guillermo Alfredo Torres (born February 10, 1959 in San Antonio de los Baños) is a Cuban sport shooter. He competed in skeet shooting events at the Summer Olympics in 1980, 1992, 1996, 2000, 2004, and 2012.

Olympic results

References

Cuban male sport shooters
Living people
Olympic shooters of Cuba
Shooters at the 1980 Summer Olympics
Shooters at the 1992 Summer Olympics
Shooters at the 1996 Summer Olympics
Shooters at the 2000 Summer Olympics
Shooters at the 2004 Summer Olympics
Shooters at the 2012 Summer Olympics
Shooters at the 2015 Pan American Games
1959 births
Pan American Games medalists in shooting
Pan American Games gold medalists for Cuba
Pan American Games silver medalists for Cuba
Medalists at the 2011 Pan American Games
People from San Antonio de los Baños
20th-century Cuban people
21st-century Cuban people